The following is a list of notable people who were born, raised, or a resident of the U.S. state of Connecticut, with place of birth or residence when known.

Actors, producers, and directors

 Christopher Abbott (Greenwich)
 Bruce Altman (New Haven)
 Lauren Ambrose (New Haven)
 Tony Amendola (New Haven)
 Brad Anderson (Madison)
 John Ashton (Enfield)
 William Atherton (Orange)
 Valerie Azlynn (New London)
 Kevin Bacon (Sharon)
 Roger Bart (Norwalk)
 David Alan Basche (Hartford)
 Ryan Michelle Bathe (Stamford)
 Anne Baxter (Easton)
 Graham Beckel (Old Lyme)
 Ed Begley (Hartford)
 Richard Belzer (Bridgeport)
 Polly Bergen (Southbury)
 John Billingsley (Weston)
 Michael Ian Black (Redding)
 Linda Blair (Westport)
 Roberts Blossom (New Haven)
 Ernest Borgnine (Hamden)
 Kate Bosworth (Darien)
 Jesse Bradford (Norwalk)
 Jonathan Brandis (Danbury)
 Alexandra Breckenridge (Darien)
 Amy Brenneman (Glastonbury)
 Brooke Brodack (Putnam)
 Chris Bruno (Milford)
 Dylan Bruno (Milford)
 Gary Burghoff (Bristol)
 Brooke Burke (Hartford)
 John Byrum (Redding)
 Mary Cadorette (East Hartford)
 Mike Cahill (New Haven)
 David Canary (Wilton)
 Katherine Cannon (Hartford)
 Art Carney (Westbrook)
 D. J. Caruso (Norwalk)
 Adriana Caselotti (Bridgeport)
 Marilyn Chambers (Westport)
 Joe Cipriano (Oakville)
 Spencer Treat Clark (Darien)
 Glenn Close (Greenwich)
 Martha Coolidge (New Haven)
 Daniel Cosgrove (New Haven)
 D.J. Cotrona (Wallingford)
 Bob Crane (Waterbury)
 Jane Curtin (Sharon)
 Dan Curtis (Bridgeport)
 Paul Dano (Wilton)
 Jules Dassin (Middletown)
 Jeff Davis (Milford)
 Dana Delany (Stamford)
 Brian Dennehy (Bridgeport)
 Jenna Dewan (Hartford)
 George DiCenzo (New Haven)
 Allie DiMeco (Waterbury)
 Troy Duffy (Hartford)
 Charles H. Eglee (New Haven)
 Jill Eikenberry (New Haven)
 Abby Elliott (Wilton)
 Linda Evans (Hartford)
 Mark Famiglietti (Clinton)
 Michael J. Fox (Sharon)
 Kevin Foxe (Enfield)
 Will Friedle (Hartford)
 Paul Fusco (New Haven)
 Catherine Gardner (Waterbury)
 Marcus Giamatti (New Haven)
 Paul Giamatti (New Haven)
 Cynthia Gibb (Westport)
 William Gillette (Hartford)
 Grant Goodeve (Middlebury)
 Topher Grace (Darien)
 David Marshall Grant (Westport)
 Luke Greenfield (Westport)
 Shelley Hack (Greenwich)
 June Havoc (Wilton)
 Sterling Hayden (Wilton)
 Glenne Headly (New London)
 Jessica Hecht (Bloomfield)
 Kevin Heffernan (West Haven)
 Katherine Heigl (New Canaan)
 Lillian Hellman (New Milford)
 Katharine Hepburn (Hartford)
 Linda Hunt (Westport)
 Allison Janney (Lakeville)
 Arline Judge (Bridgeport)
 Adam Kaufman (New Canaan)
 Elia Kazan (Newtown)
 Lisa Robin Kelly (Southington)
 Ted Knight (Terryville)
 Camille Kostek (Killingworth)
 David LaChapelle (Fairfield)
 Lisa Lampanelli (Trumbull)
 Hope Lange (Redding)
 Eriq La Salle (Hartford)
 Matt Lauer (Greenwich)
 Adam LaVorgna (North Branford)
 Norman Lear (New Haven)
 Denis Leary (Roxbury)
 David Letterman (New Canaan)
 Barry Levinson (Redding)
 Paul Lieberstein (Westport)
 Mark Linn-Baker (Wethersfield)
 Christopher Lloyd (Stamford)
 Michelle Lombardo (Glastonbury)
 Justin Long (Fairfield)
 Billy Lush (New Haven)
 Seth MacFarlane (Kent)
 Fredric March (New Milford)
 Pamela Sue Martin (Westport)
 Dylan McDermott (Waterbury)
 Biff McGuire (New Haven)
 Stephanie McMahon (Weston)
 Jesse Metcalfe (New London)
 Steve Miner (Westport)
 Robert Mitchum (Bridgeport)
 Gretchen Mol (Deep River)
 Marilyn Monroe (Weston and Roxbury)
 Sheri Moon (Plainville)
 Jonathan Mostow (Woodbridge)
 Michael G. Moye (New Haven)
 Marty Munsch (Greenwich)
 George Murphy (New Haven)
 Ellen Muth (Milford)
 David Naughton (Hartford)
 James Naughton (Middletown)
 Kevin Nealon (Bridgeport)
 Paul Newman (Westport)
 Becki Newton (New Haven)
 Tom Noonan (Greenwich)
 Fred Norris (Willimantic)
 Nolan North (New Haven)
 Ron Palillo (Cheshire)
 Joe Pantoliano (Wilton)
 Don Pardo (Norwich)
 Dean Parisot (Wilton)
 Paul Perri (New Haven)
 Bijou Phillips (Greenwich)
 Jacob Pitts (Weston)
 Tracy Pollan (Sharon)
 Anthony Tyler Quinn (New London)
 John Ratzenberger (Bridgeport)
 Evan Rogers (Mansfield)
 Christy Carlson Romano (Milford)
 Anika Noni Rose (Bloomfield)
 Sherrie Rose (Hartford)
 Matt Ross (Greenwich)
 Rosalind Russell (Waterbury)
 Meg Ryan (Bethel and Fairfield)
 Peter Sarsgaard (Fairfield)
 Michael Schur (West Hartford)
 Annabella Sciorra (Wethersfield)
 Kyra Sedgwick (Sharon)
 Chloë Sevigny (Darien)
 Louise Shaffer (Woodbridge)
 Spec Shea (Naugatuck)
 Micah Sloat (Westport)
 Patricia Smith (New Haven)
 Bill Smitrovich (Bridgeport)
 Zack Snyder (Greenwich)
 Raymond St. Jacques (Hartford)
 David H. Steinberg (West Hartford)
 Austin Stowell (Kensington)
 Tara Subkoff (Westport)
 Ed Sullivan (Southbury)
 Larry Sullivan (New Haven)
 Pawel Szajda (Farmington)
 Lee Tergesen (Ivoryton)
 Mark Tinker (Stamford)
 Tony Todd (Hartford)
 Jim True-Frost (Greenwich)
 Tom Tryon (Hartford)
 Raviv Ullman (Fairfield)
 James Van Der Beek (Cheshire)
 Gus Van Sant (Darien)
 Diane Venora (East Hartford)
 Jenna von Oÿ (Stamford)
 Wende Wagner (New London)
 Christopher Walken (Wilton)
 Tonja Walker (Easton)
 Deborah Walley (Bridgeport)
 Sam Waterston (Sharon)
 Michael Weatherly (Fairfield)
 Bruce Weitz (Norwalk)
 Titus Welliver (New Haven)
 Michael Jai White (Bridgeport)
 Treat Williams (Norwalk)
 Fay Wolf (Fairfield)
 Joanne Woodward (Westport)
 Kari Wührer (Brookfield)
 Madeline Zima (New Haven)

Athletes

 Brad Ausmus (Cheshire)
 John Bagley  (Bridgeport)
 Jeff Bagwell (Killingworth)
 Chris Baker (Windsor)
 Vin Baker (Old Saybrook)
 Matt Barnes (Bethel)
 Semyon Belits-Geiman (Stamford)
 Keith Bennett (born 1961), American-Israeli basketball player (Stamford)
 James Blake (Fairfield)
 Steve Blass (Canaan)
 Andy Bloom (Stamford)
 Nick Bonino (Farmington)
 Craig Breslow (New Haven)
 Scott Burrell (Hamden)
 Donn Cabral (Glastonbury)
 Marcus Camby (South Windsor)
 Walter Camp (New Britain)
 Dave Campo (Groton)
 Howard Cann (Bridgeport)
 Jack Capuano (Kent)
 Jesse Carlson (New Britain)
 Aaron Civale (East Windsor)
 Chris Clark (South Windsor)
 Jaidon Codrington (Bridgeport)
 Roger Connor (Waterbury)
 Marcus Cooper (Bloomfield)
 Brock Coyle (Norwalk)
 Carmen Cozza (Orange)
 Dan Cramer (Stamford)
 Tommy Cross (Simsbury)
 Jerome Cunningham (Waterbury)
 Rajai Davis (Norwich)
 Chad Dawson (New Haven)
 Brian Dayett (New London)
 Ryan Delaire (Bloomfield)
 Chris Denorfia (Bristol)
 John DiBartolomeo (Westport)
 Rob Dibble (Southington)
 Walt Dropo (Moosup)
 Andre Drummond (Middletown)
 Chris Drury (Trumbull)
 Vladimir Ducasse (Stamford)
 Marcus Easley (Bridgeport)
 Johnny Egan  (Hartford)
David Efianayi (Manchester)
 Dwight Freeney (Bloomfield)
 Kevin Gilbride (New Haven)
 Ryan Gomes (Waterbury)
 Jesse Hahn (Norwich)
 Ron Hainsey (Bolton)
 Dorothy Hamill (Greenwich)
 Matt Harvey (Groton)
 Anttaj Hawthorne (Hamden)
 Doug Henry (Torrington)
 J. J. Henry (Fairfield)
 Aaron Hernandez (Bristol)
 Jared Hughes (Stamford)
 John Jenkins (Meriden)
 Caitlyn Jenner (Newtown)
 Jay Johnstone (Manchester)
 Byron Jones (New Britain)
 Tebucky Jones (New Britain)
 Tyrique Jones 
 Joan Joyce (Waterbury)
 Terrance Knighton (Hartford)
 Paul Konerko (Norwich)
 Niko Koutouvides (Plainville)
 Brian Leetch (Cheshire)
 Ivan Lendl (Goshen)
 Dominic Leone (Norwich)
 Kristine Lilly (Wilton)
 Floyd Little (New Haven)
 Rebecca Lobo (Hartford)
 Joey Logano (Middletown)
 Cliff Louis (Stamford)
 Rick Mahorn (Hartford)
 Wes Matthews (Bridgeport)
 Dick McAuliffe (Farmington)
 John McDonald (New London)
 Paul Menhart (Mystic)
 Johnny Moore (Waterbury)
George H. Morris (born 1938), equestrian
 Charlie Morton (Redding)
 Calvin Murphy (Norwalk)
 Phil Murphy (New London)
 Jerry Nadeau (Danbury)
 Charles Nagy (Fairfield)
 Nick Newell (Milford)
 Mary Anne O'Connor (Fairfield)
 Lamar Odom (New Britain)
 Mike Olt (Branford)
 Dan Orlovsky (Shelton)
 Jim O'Rourke (Bridgeport) 
 Max Pacioretty (New Canaan)
 Paul Pasqualoni (Cheshire)
 Carl Pavano (Southington)
 Willie Pep (Middletown)
 Jimmy Piersall (Waterbury)
 Nick Pietrosante (Derby)
 A. J. Pollock (Hebron)
 Ryan Preece (Berlin)
 Jonathan Quick (Milford)
 Randy Rasmussen (Wilton)
 David Reed (New Britain)
 Jordan Reed (New Britain)
 Charlie Reiter (born 1988), soccer player (Westport)
 Jamey Richard (Weston)
 Andy Robustelli (Stamford) 
 Bill Rodgers (athlete) (Hartford)
 Bill Romanowski (Vernon)
 Maxie Rosenbloom (Leonard Bridge)
 Bob Schaefer (Putnam)
 Evan Scribner (New Milford)
 Julius Seligson (Westport)
 Dan Shannon (Bridgeport)
 Scott Sharp (Norwalk)
 Jimmy Shea (West Hartford)
 Jeff Simmons (Hartford)
 Dan Sileo (Stamford)
 Charles Smith  (Bridgeport)
 Chris Smith (Bridgeport)
 Kieran Smith (Ridgefield)
 Will Solomon (born 1978), basketball player (Hartford)
 Tony Sparano (West Haven)
 Amari Spievey (Middletown)
 George Springer (New Britain)
 Ken Strong (West Haven)
 John Sullivan (Greenwich)
 Glover Teixeira (Danbury)
 Tim Teufel (Greenwich)
 Tom Thibodeau (New Britain)
 Donald Thomas (New Haven)
 Marcus Tracy (Newtown)
 Triple H (Weston)
 Dick Tuckey (Naugatuck)
 Will Tye (Middletown)
 Bobby Valentine (Stamford)
 Stephen Valiquette (Orange)
 Mo Vaughn (Norwalk)
 Dave Wallace (Waterbury)
 Björn Werner (Salisbury)
 Jordan Williams (Torrington)
 Ron Wotus (Hartford)
 Steve Young (Greenwich)
 Josh Zeid (New Haven)

Authors, artists, and educators

 Christopher Andersen (Washington)
 Jacob M. Appel (Branford)
 Harriet Pritchard Arnold (Killingly)
 Rosecrans Baldwin (Darien)
 Edward C. Banfield (Bloomfield)
 Joel Barlow (Redding)
 Dan Beard (Redding)
 A. Scott Berg (Norwalk)
 Mary C. Billings (Litchfield)
 Joseph Payne Brennan (Bridgeport and New Haven)
 Thom Brooks (Guilford)
 Emily S. Bouton (New Canaan)
 William F. Buckley Jr. (New York City and Stamford)
 Candace Bushnell (Glastonbury)
 Guido Calabresi (New Haven)
 Al Capp (New Haven)
 Marietta Stanley Case (Thompson)
 Noah Charney (New Haven)
 Frances Manwaring Caulkins (New London)
 Lincoln Child (Westport)
 Emma Shaw Colcleugh (Thompson)
 Christopher Collier (Orange)
 Suzanne Collins (Hartford and Newtown)
 Kate Cordsen (Essex)
 Nathan Daboll (Groton)
 Mary Ann H. Dodd (Hartford)
 Clay Dreslough (Ashford)
 John Gregory Dunne (Hartford)
 Addie C. Strong Engle (Manchester)
 Eleanor Estes (West Haven)
 Mallory Factor (Bridgeport)
 Howard Fast (Redding)
 Harriet Ford (Seymour)
 Edward Miner Gallaudet (Hartford)
 Elizabeth Gilbert (Waterbury)
 Charlotte Perkins Gilman (Hartford)
 Daniel Coit Gilman (Norwich)
 Thyrza Nichols Goodeve (Middlebury)
 Hanna Holborn Gray (New Haven)
 Kate E. Griswold (West Hartford)
 Anna Huntington (Bethel)
 Chauncey Ives (Hamden)
 Klaus Janson (Bridgeport)
 Deane Keller (New Haven)
 John Frederick Kensett (Cheshire)
 Charles H. Kraft (Waterbury)
 Larry Kramer (Bridgeport)
 Madeleine L'Engle (Goshen)
 Wally Lamb (Mansfield)
 Annie Leibovitz (Waterbury)
 Robert Ludlum (Southport)
 Ira Levin (Wilton)
 Sol LeWitt (Hartford)
 Frank Luntz (West Hartford)
 Elizabeth Eunice Smith Marcy (East Hampton)
 E. Louisa Mather (East Haddam)
 Jay McInerney (Hartford)
 Eric Metaxas (Danbury)
 Stephenie Meyer (Hartford)
 Arthur Miller (Roxbury)
 Emily Cheney Neville (Manchester)
 Flannery O'Connor (Redding)
 John Pekkanen (Lyme)
 Derek Pell (Weston)
 Jacques Pepin (Madison)
 Sarah Phillips (Wilton)
 Kenneth Pike (Woodstock)
 Delia Lyman Porter (New Haven)
 Charles Ethan Porter (Hartford)
 Frederick Pratson (Hartford)
 Annie Proulx (Norwich)
 Luanne Rice (New Britain)
 Mary A. Ripley (Windham)
 Bill Roorbach (New Canaan)
 Philip Roth (Warren)
 Acharya S (Avon)
 Vincent Scully (New Haven)
 George Selden (Hartford)
 Richard Selzer (North Branford)
 Maurice Sendak (Ridgefield)
 Mark Shasha (New London)
 Lurana W. Sheldon (Hadlyme)
 Lydia Sigourney (Hartford)
 T. O'Conor Sloane Jr. (Westport)
 T. O'Conor Sloane III (Westport)
 Dorothy Hope Smith (Westport)
 Sarah Lanman Smith (Norwich)
 Victoria Leigh Soto (Bridgeport)
 Armstrong Sperry (Stamford, New Canaan, and New Haven)
 Benjamin Spock (New Haven)
 Edward Steichen (Redding)
 Wallace Stevens (Hartford)
 Lavinia Stoddard (Guilford)
 Roger Stone (Norwalk)
 Harriet Beecher Stowe (Litchfield)
 Arthur Szyk (New Canaan)
 Sarah Katherine Taylor (Danielsonville)
 Laura M. Thurston (Norfolk)
 Alton Tobey (Middletown)
 Ada Josephine Todd (Redding)
 Garry Trudeau (Branford) 
 Louisa Caroline Tuthill (New Haven)
 Mark Twain (Hartford and Redding)
 Mary E. Van Lennep (Hartford)
 Ocean Vuong (Hartford)
 Edward Lewis Wallant (New Haven)
 Noah Webster (present-day West Hartford)
 J. Alden Weir (Ridgefield)
 Abigail Goodrich Whittelsey (Ridgefield)

Business people, scientists, and inventors

 George Akerlof (New Haven)
 Moses Austin (Durham)
 Edward C. Banfield (Bloomfield)
 P.T. Barnum (Bethel and Bridgeport)
 William Beaumont (Lebanon)
 John Bello (Plainville)
 Henry Alfred Bishop (Bridgeport)
 Cornelius Scranton Bushnell (Madison)
 David Bushnell (Saybrook)
 Vint Cerf (New Haven)
 Wesley A. Clark (New Haven)
 Kenton Clarke (Fairfield)
 Jared Cohen (Weston)
 Samuel Colt (Hartford)
 Carol Lynn Curchoe (Manchester)
 Ray Dalio (Greenwich/Westport)
 Bern Dibner (Wilton)
 Robert Epstein (Hartford)
 James Farrell (New Haven)
 John Fitch (Hartford County)
 Anselm Franz (Stratford)
 Josiah Willard Gibbs (New Haven)
 Alfred G. Gilman (New Haven)
 Charles Goodyear (New Haven)
 James J. Greco (Hamden)
 Robert N. Hall (New Haven)
 Louis Harris (New Haven)
 Arthur William Haydon (Waterbury)
 Allan Hobson (Hartford)
 Harvey Hubbell (Bridgeport)
 Collis Potter Huntington (Harwinton)
 James M. Hyde (Mystic Bridge)
 Jeffrey R. Immelt (New Canaan)
 Bradley S. Jacobs (Greenwich)
 Betsey Johnson (Wethersfield)
 Alfred Winslow Jones (Redding)
 Edward Calvin Kendall (South Norwalk)
 Mary Dixon Kies (South Killingly)
 George E. Kimball (New Britain)
 Stephen Cole Kleene (Hartford)
 Edwin H. Land (Bridgeport)
 Henry Lee (Orange)
 Albert L. Lehninger (Bridgeport)
 Allen Cleveland Lewis (Sterling)
 Alvin Liberman (Mansfield)
 Saunders Mac Lane (Taftville)
 John C. Malone (Milford)
 John Martin (Old Lyme)
 Barbara McClintock (Hartford)
 Stephanie McMahon (Hartford)
 Sean McManus (Fairfield)
 Daniel J. Mitchell (Wilton)
 Samuel Augustus Mitchell (Bristol)
 Samuel Morey (Hebron)
 J. P. Morgan (Hartford)
 Roy Neuberger (Bridgeport)
 Victor Niederhoffer (Weston)
 Frederick Law Olmsted (Hartford)
 Ken Olsen (Stratford)
 Eliphalet Remington (Suffield)
Stephen S. Roach (born 1945), economist
 Peter Schiff (New Haven)
 Joseph Earl Sheffield (Southport)
 Igor Sikorsky (Stratford, Trumbull and Easton)
 Benjamin Silliman (Trumbull and New Haven)
 Chip Skowron, hedge fund portfolio manager convicted of insider trading (Greenwich)
 Alfred P. Sloan (New Haven)
 George Smith (Norwalk)
 Christopher Spencer (Manchester)
 Roger Wolcott Sperry (Hartford)
 Frank J. Sprague (Milford)
 Frederick Stanley (New Britain)
 John William Sterling (Stratford)
 Martha Stewart (Westport)
 Francis Sumner (Pomfret)
 Eli Terry (East Windsor)
 Seth Thomas (Wolcott)
 John Hasbrouck Van Vleck (Middletown)
 William H. Welch (Norfolk)
 Warren L. Wheaton (Pomfret)
 Nathaniel Wheeler (Bridgeport)
 Dana White (Manchester)
 Gustave Whitehead (Bridgeport)
 Eli Whitney (New Haven)
 Oliver Fisher Winchester (New Haven)
 Arthur Williams Wright (Lebanon)
 Robert Charles Wright (Southport)
 Steve Wynn (New Haven)

Journalists and commentators

 Joseph Alsop (Avon)
 Stewart Alsop (Avon)
 Julie Banderas (Hartford)
 Wayne Barrett (New Britain)
 Chris Berman (Greenwich and Cheshire)
 Thom Brooks (Guilford)
 Chris Cillizza (Marlborough)
 Rita Cosby (Greenwich)
 Ann Coulter (New Canaan)
 Ross Douthat (New Haven)
 Charles Dow (Sterling)
 Dick Ebersol (Torrington)
 Kelly Evans (Hartford)
 Frank Fixaris (Torrington)
 Brendan Gill (Hartford)
 Linda Greenhouse (Hamden)
 Burton J. Hendrick (New Haven)
 Don Imus (Westport)
 Laura Ingraham (Glastonbury)
 Larry Kudlow (Redding)
 Kenny Mayne (Bethel)
 Leigh Montville (New Haven)
 Dick Morris (Redding)
 Tim Murnane (Naugatuck)
 Candace Owens (Stamford)
 Dan Patrick (Milford)
 Steve Phillips (Wilton)
 Molly Qerim (New Haven)
 Lonnie Quinn (Cheshire)
 Joan Rivers (New Milford)
 Andy Rooney (Norwalk)
 David Sirota (New Haven)
 James Surowiecki (Meriden)
 Ida Tarbell (Easton)
 Sabrina Tavernise (Hartford)
 Liz Trotta (New Haven)
 Trey Wingo (Greenwich)
 Sid Yudain (New Canaan)

Military figures

 Ethan Allen (Litchfield)
 Benedict Arnold (Norwich)
 Daniel Bissell (East Windsor)
 John Brown (Torrington)
 Thomas L. Brown II (Danbury)
 Daniel C. Burbank (Manchester)
 John Butler (New London)
 Tedford H. Cann (Bridgeport)
 Benjamin Delahauf Foulois (Washington)
 Walter S. Gorka (Windsor Locks)
 Nathan Hale (Coventry)
 David Hawley (Bridgeport)
 Isaac Hull (Derby)
 David Humphreys (Derby)
 Raymond Jacobs (Bridgeport)
 Everett F. Larson (Stamford)
 Ezra Lee (Lyme)
 John Levitow (Hartford)
 Henry A. Mucci (Bridgeport)
 Robert J. Papp Jr. (Norwich)
 Samuel Holden Parsons (Lyme)
 Israel Putnam (Brooklyn)
 Gold Selleck Silliman (Fairfield)
 Robert Stethem (Waterbury)
 Benjamin Tallmadge (Litchfield)
 John Trumbull (Lebanon)
 James Wadsworth (Durham)
 Philip C. Wehle (Westport)
 Irving Wiltsie (Hartford)
 David Wooster (Stratford)

Musicians, singers, and composers

 Marian Anderson (Danbury)

Jaehyun
 Apathy (rapper) (Willimantic)
 Timothy Archambault (Willimantic)
 Veronica Ballestrini (Waterford)
 Mark Berman (New Haven)
 Kath Bloom (New Haven)
 Michael Bolton (New Haven)
 Dave Brubeck (Wilton)
 Igor Buketoff (Hartford)
 Gary Burr (Meriden)
 Ray Cappo (Danbury)
 Karen Carpenter (New Haven)
 Richard Carpenter (New Haven)
 Chris Carrabba (West Hartford)
 Cassie (New London)
 Javier Colon (Stratford)
 Rivers Cuomo (Storrs)
 Julia DeMato (Brookfield)
 Dirt E. Dutch (Danbury)
 José Feliciano (Westport)
 Joe Flood (Portland)
 Nick Fradiani (Guilford)
 Chris Frantz (Fairfield)
 Sawyer Fredericks (Newtown)
 Stan Freeman (Waterbury)
 Daryl Hall (Redding)
 Hatebreed (Bridgeport)
 Jascha Heifetz (Redding)
 Grayson Hugh (Danbury)
 Charles Ives (Danbury)
 Bernard Jackson (Stamford)
 Ben Kopec (Ansonia)
 Meat Loaf (Redding)
 John Mayer (Fairfield)
 Peter McCann (Bridgeport)
 Mark McGrath (Hartford)
 Dom McLennon (Hartford)
 Brad Mehldau (West Hartford)
 Syesha Mercado (Bridgeport)
 Moby (Darien)
 Jimmy Monaghan (Danbury)
 Thurston Moore (Bethel)
 Alfred Newman (New Haven)
 Liz Phair (New Haven)
 Gene Pitney (Hartford)
 Keith Richards (Weston)
 Dawn Robinson (New London)
 Nile Rodgers (Westport)
 Diana Ross (Greenwich)
 Emily Saliers (New Haven)
 John Scofield (Wilton)
 Horace Silver (Norwalk)
 Ronnie Spector (Brookfield)
 Steve Stevens (Hartford)
 Seth Swirsky (New Haven)
 Mary Travers (Redding)
 Cassie Ventura (New London)
 Franco Ventriglia (Fairfield)
 Vinnie Vincent (Bridgeport)
 Chris Webby (Norwalk)
 Robert Wendel (Bridgeport)
 Tina Weymouth (Fairfield)
 Brian Yale (Orange)

Politicians and statesmen

 Dean Acheson (Middletown)
 Abraham Baldwin (Guilford)
 Roger Sherman Baldwin (New Haven)
 Ebenezer Bassett (Derby)
 Donald Berwick (Moodus)
 Cofer Black (Stamford)
 George H. W. Bush (Greenwich)
 George W. Bush (New Haven)
 Prescott Bush (Greenwich)
 Elinor Carbone (Torrington)
 Orlow W. Chapman (Ellington)
 Anthony Comstock (New Canaan)
 Joe Courtney (Hartford)
 Silas Deane (Groton)
 Robert E. De Forest (Bridgeport)
 Rosa DeLauro (New Haven)
 Christopher Dodd (Willimantic)
 Peter H. Dominick (Stamford)
 Oliver Ellsworth (Windsor)
 Anna Eshoo (New Britain)
 John Fabrizi (Bridgeport)
 Gary Franks (Waterbury)
 Porter J. Goss (Waterbury)
 Ella T. Grasso (Windsor Locks)
 Galusha A. Grow (Ashford)
 Lyman Hall (Wallingford)
 Hope Hicks (Greenwich)
 Titus Hosmer (Middletown)
 Samuel Huntington (Windham)
 Robert A. Hurley (Bridgeport)
 William Samuel Johnson (Stratford)
 Ethel Skakel Kennedy (Greenwich)
 Henry Kissinger (Kent)
 John Larson (East Hartford)
 Scooter Libby (New Haven)
 Joe Lieberman (Stamford)
 Clare Boothe Luce (Ridgefield)
 Dannel Malloy (Stamford)
 Robert Moses (New Haven)
 Constance Motley (New Haven)
 Ralph Nader (Winsted)
 Frederick Walker Pitkin (Manchester)
 Adam Clayton Powell Jr. (New Haven)
 Abraham A. Ribicoff (New Britain)
 Pete Rouse (New Haven)
 John G. Rowland (Waterbury)
 Christopher Shays (Bridgeport)
 Roger Sherman (New Haven)
 Samuel Simons (Bridgeport)
 Joseph Spencer (East Haddam)
 Kathleen Kennedy Townsend (Greenwich)
 Jonathan Trumbull (Lebanon)
 Jonathan Trumbull Jr. (Lebanon)
 Lyman Trumbull (Colchester)
 Donald Verrilli Jr. (Wilton)
 Morrison Waite (Lyme)
 Mark Warner (Vernon)
 Gideon Welles (Glastonbury)
 William Williams (Lebanon)
 Oliver Wolcott (Windsor)
 Oliver Wolcott Jr. (Litchfield)
 Richard Woodbury (New Haven)

Religious and spiritual figures
 Ebenezer Baldwin (Norwich)
 Henry Ward Beecher (Litchfield)
 Lyman Beecher (New Haven)
 Aaron Burr, Sr. (Fairfield)
 Blackleach Burritt (Huntington)
 Horace Bushnell (Litchfield)
 Henry Sloane Coffin (Lakeville)
 Jonathan Edwards (East Windsor)
 Charles Grandison Finney (Warren)
 Gordon Hall (Tolland)
 Michael J. McGivney (New Haven)
 Kenneth Pike (Woodstock)
 Henry Weston Smith (Ellington)
 Ed & Lorraine Warren (Monroe)
 Wilford Woodruff (Farmington)
 John Zaffis (Stratford)

YouTube celebrities

 Jack Baran (Fairfield)
 Eugenia Cooney (Greenwich)
 Charli D'Amelio  (Norwalk)
 Dixie D'Amelio  (Norwalk)
 Anthony Fantano (Wolcott)
 Casey Neistat (Ledyard)
 Daymon Patterson (New Britain)
 DSPGaming (Bridgeport)

Other figures
 Ruth Maxon Adams (New Haven)
 Erin Brady (East Hampton)
 Keith Carlos (Bridgeport)
 John Carpenter (Hamden)
 Scott Conant (Waterbury)
 Lydia Hearst (Wilton)
 Helen Keller (Easton)
 Ruth Madoff (born 1941), wife of Bernie Madoff
 Anthony Megale (1953–2015), mobster and former acting underboss of the Gambino crime family

See also

 List of people from Bridgeport, Connecticut
 List of people from Brookfield, Connecticut
 List of people from Darien, Connecticut 
 List of people from Greenwich, Connecticut
 List of people from Hartford, Connecticut
 List of people from New Canaan, Connecticut
 List of people from New Haven, Connecticut
 List of people from Norwalk, Connecticut
 List of people from Redding, Connecticut
 List of people from Ridgefield, Connecticut
 List of people from Stamford, Connecticut
 List of people from Westport, Connecticut

References